The Bernina-Bahngesellschaft Ge 4/4 82, later known as the Rhaetian Railway Ge 4/4 182, is a 1,000 V DC metre gauge B′B′ electrically powered heritage locomotive made in Switzerland.

The Ge 4/4 is so named under the Swiss locomotive and railcar classification system. According to that system, Ge 4/4 denotes a narrow gauge electric locomotive with a total of four axles, all of which are drive axles.

Less formally, the locomotive is nicknamed the Bernina Crocodile, due to its external similarity to the Crocodile locomotives of Rhaetian Railway type Ge 6/6 I, and Swiss Federal Railways types Ce 6/8 I and Ce 6/8 II.  However, the Ge 4/4 182 is not an articulated locomotive, and therefore the Crocodile nickname is not entirely accepted as appropriate for it.

History
After entering service in 1928, the Ge 4/4 operated on the Bernina Railway, linking St Moritz in Switzerland with Tirano in Italy, via the Bernina Pass.  Its fleet number in its Bernina Railway service was 82.

In 1943, the previously independent Bernina Railway was taken over by the Rhaetian Railway (RhB), which is the main railway network in the Canton of Graubünden, Switzerland.  At the time of the takeover, the Ge 4/4, like all of the Bernina Railway's other motive power, was similarly acquired by the Rhaetian Railway.  The locomotive continued to haul trains on the Bernina Railway.  In 1962, the locomotive was renumbered 182, to help free up the numbers in the range 51-99 for use on rail tractors.  It was withdrawn from service in 1977.

The locomotive was then transferred to the Swiss Transport Museum in Lucerne, where it remained until 1981.  In 1984, it was taken over by the French metre gauge Chemin de Fer de La Mure. However, the Ge 4/4 never operated there, because it was discovered, only after the locomotive's release to that railway, that it could not be used at that railway's operating voltage of 2,400 V DC.  In 1999, the locomotive was transferred again, this time to Associazione 182 of Club 1889 — a Graubünden railway club — which has since returned the now static and weathered machine back to Switzerland.

The Ge 4/4 is presently undergoing restoration.  On 10 April 2010, it was presented to the public at Poschiavo newly restored back into working order.  Upon completion of its testing program, it will be available for unrestricted operations on the Bernina Railway.

References, further reading

Notes

External links
 Club 1889
 «Club 1889» - detailed information on the history, repatriation and restoration of the locomotive 

This article is based upon a translation of the German language version as at May 2010.

SLM locomotives
B′B′ locomotives
Rhaetian Railway locomotives
Electric locomotives of Switzerland
Railway locomotives introduced in 1928
1000 V DC locomotives